The Smithsonian Institution Shelter, also known as the Mount Whitney Summit Shelter and the Mount Whitney Hut, was built in 1909 on the summit plateau of Mount Whitney, in the Sierra Nevada within Sequoia National Park, in California. It is the highest permanent building in the Contiguous United States.

History
The shelter at the summit was proposed after Byrd Surby, a U.S. Fisheries employee, was struck and killed by lightning on the summit in 1904.
The shelter was built to house scientists who used the  summit to study high-altitude phenomena in the time before sustained high-altitude flight was possible.

In 1909 the site was used by Smithsonian Astrophysical Observatory director Charles Greeley Abbot to conduct spectroscopic observations of Mars to investigate the existence of water on the planet. Other studies included observations of cosmic rays and nocturnal radiation.

Although the structure was built in part as a shelter from storms, hikers are now warned against seeking shelter there during lightning storms.

Landmark
Gustave F. Marsh, the builder of the summit trail, built the shelter with funding from the Smithsonian Institution, with assistance from the Lick Observatory. The mortared granite shelter comprises three rooms in a line with windows in each and doors in the north and south rooms. The roof is corrugated metal on a steel truss frame. The materials to build the shelter were carried to the summit by donkeys. The shelter has a log book hikers may sign.
The site has been considered for National Historic Landmark status, but has not been recommended for submission yet.  However, in 1977 the Smithsonian Institution Shelter was placed on the National Register of Historic Places.

References

National Register of Historic Places in Sequoia National Park
Park buildings and structures on the National Register of Historic Places in California
Buildings and structures in Inyo County, California
Rustic architecture in California
Smithsonian Institution
National Register of Historic Places in Inyo County, California
Buildings and structures completed in 1909
1909 establishments in California